Tirpitz Museum, also called Blåvand Bunker Museum, is a museum in Blåvand, on the coast of Jutland. It is built in an old bunker from which it got its name, and features exhibitions on the Atlantic Wall, the west coast of Denmark, and an amber collection.

History

The Tirpitz Bunker started construction in 1944, and was built as part of the defense around the city of Esbjerg. Following the surrender of the German forces, construction was halted, and the bunker was therefore never completed. The bunker was designed to house 2 turrets with 2 38 cm SK C/34 naval guns each. After the war, the bunker was abandoned and later turned into a small museum.

In 2012, it was decided to expand and completely redesign the museum, with Bjarke Ingels Group being chosen as architect of the new museum. The new museum features open spaces and is built into the dunes. The permanent exhibitions were designed by Dutch experience design agency Tinker Imagineers. 

On 29 June 2017, an opening ceremony was held, with the Crown Prince and Minister of Culture attending.

Exhibitions

The Museum features 4 exhibition areas, 3 of which are permanent exhibitions. Furthermore, it is possible to enter the old bunker and gun turret with a glass reconstruction of the artillery guns.

An Army of Concrete
Tells about Atlantic Wall and personal stories from the surrounding areas.

West Coast Stories
Tells the story of the 20,000 year old history of the Danish West Coast.

Gold of the Sea
Features the largest collection of amber in Denmark.

Non-permanent exhibition
The first non-permanent exhibition, is centered around mine clearance, and features props and sets from the movie Land of Mine.

See also

 Atlantic Wall

References

Museums in Denmark
Bjarke Ingels buildings
History museums
Kriegsmarine
Coastal fortifications
World War II sites in Denmark